The Ties That Bind or Ties That Bind may refer to:

Film 
 The Ties That Bind, a 1985 film by Su Friedrich
 The Tie That Binds (1995 film), a 1995 movie starring  Daryl Hannah and Keith Carradine
 Ties That Bind, a 2006 movie starring Nicole de Boer
 Ties That Bind, a 2010 TV movie starring Kristanna Loken
 Ties That Bind (film), a 2011 film, directed by Leila Djansi

Literature 
 The Ties That Bind (novel), a 1993 novel by Vanessa Duriès
 The Ties That Bind (Star Wars), a novel in the Jedi Apprentice series by Jude Watson
 Ties That Bind, a 1993 book by Guy Baldwin

Music 
 "Blest be the tie that binds" (theologian John Fawcett's most famous hymn, from 1782) which appears to have originated this saying 'The Ties That Bind'
 "The Ties That Bind" (Bruce Springsteen song), 1980
 "The Ties That Bind" (Don Williams song), 1974
 "Ties That Bind", a song by Alter Bridge from Blackbird
 "Caustic Are The Ties That Bind", a song by Trivium from In Waves
 "The Ties That Bind", a song by Kamelot from Haven
The Ties That Bind: The River Collection, box set by Bruce Springsteen

Television 
 "The Ties That Bind", an episode of Andromeda
 "The Ties That Bind" (Arrow)
 "The Ties That Bind" (Battlestar Galactica)
 "The Ties That Bind" (Jeeves and Wooster)
 "The Ties That Bind" (The O.C.)
 "The Ties That Bind" (Justice League Unlimited), a television episode
 "Ties That Bind", an episode of The Loud House
 "Ties That Bind" (She-Ra and the Princess of Power)
 "The Ties That Bind" (Stargate SG-1)
 "Ties That Bind" (Xena: Warrior Princess)
 "The Ties That Bind", an episode of The Vampire Diaries
 Ties That Bind, an episode of Revolution
 "Ties That Bind Us", an episode of Hustle
 "The Ties That Bind" (繋がれるもの, Tsunagareru Mono), the 364th episode of the Naruto: Shippuden anime
 "The Ties That Bind JoJo" (JOJOを結ぶ絆, JōJo o Musubu Kizuna), the 15th episode of the Battle Tendency arc of the JoJo's Bizarre Adventure anime, and the 24th episode of the show overall
 Ties That Bind (TV series), a series on Up.
 "The Ties That Bind" (1997 episode of the tv series Kavanagh QC.
 Ties That Bind, an episode of Beyond

Video games
 Street Fighter IV: The Ties That Bind, an animated movie tie-in of the video game Street Fighter IV
 The Suffering: Ties That Bind, a 2005 video game
 The Walking Dead: A New Frontier – Ties That Bind Parts I & II, the first two episode of The Walking Dead: A New Frontier video game